Michael or Mike Lake is the name of:

People
 Mike Lake (politician) (born 1969), Canadian politician
 Mike Lake (footballer) (born 1966), English football (soccer) player
 Michael Lake, former member of the Australian alternative rock band Adam Said Galore
 Michael Lake, designer of the Jamaica theme of the World's Fair/Universal Exposition, Seville Expo '92

Others
 Tin Can Mike Lake, a lake in Minnesota

See also
 Michael (disambiguation)